Hans Pfann (14 September 1920 – 9 September 2021) was a German gymnast. He competed at the 1952 and 1956 Summer Olympics in all artistic gymnastics events and finished in fourth and fifth place with the German team, respectively. Individually his best achievement was 18th place on the rings in 1952.

References

External links

1920 births
2021 deaths
German centenarians
German male artistic gymnasts
Gymnasts at the 1952 Summer Olympics
Gymnasts at the 1956 Summer Olympics
Olympic gymnasts of the United Team of Germany
Olympic gymnasts of West Germany
Sportspeople from Nuremberg
Men centenarians